Paw Paw is a community in south central Sullivan County, in the U.S. state of Missouri, which the GNIS classifies as a populated place.

The name was sometimes spelled "Pawpaw". A post office called Pawpaw was established in 1899 and remained in operation until 1905. The community most likely was so named because of the paw paw thickets near the original town site.

References

Ghost towns in Missouri
Former populated places in Sullivan County, Missouri